The 2010 Appomattox shootings was a mass murder in Appomattox, Virginia that occurred on January 19, 2010. 40 year-old Christopher Bryan Speight fatally shot his sister, her husband, and her son and daughter at their home, as well as four other people. He then escaped into a forest and shot at a police helicopter searching for him, but eventually surrendered himself to authorities. On February 15, 2013, Speight was sentenced to life imprisonment.

Shooting

The incident began on January 19, 2010, when police were called to a road outside Appomattox on a report of a man who required medical attention. When police arrived, they were fired on by the suspect, Christopher Bryan Speight, who also fired on a police helicopter, forcing it to make an emergency landing. Shortly afterwards, the suspect fled to a wooded area, where a force of more than a hundred police officers surrounded him. Police found three people dead in a house co-owned by the gunman (his sister and the house's co-owner, Lauralee Sipe, and her husband, Dwayne Sipe, both 38, and their four-year-old son, Joshua), and four others dead outside the house, with the last victim dying on the road. Police said that the victims were both men and women, and all were previously acquainted with the suspect. Speight was believed to have acted alone.

He surrendered on January 20, near the same wooded area where police thought he had been surrounded. He was wearing a bulletproof vest, but was not carrying the high-powered rifle believed to be the weapon used.

Prior to his surrender, police put a school and local businesses on lockdown, and advised residents to lock their houses and not go outside.  Police were concerned that Speight's house had been rigged with explosives, and a bomb squad searched the building the morning after the attack. Explosives were found both inside and around the building, and were detonated safely.  The house had sat unsecured for more than twelve hours as state police assumed local deputies had secured the house, and vice versa.

Speight was employed as a security guard for Old Dominion Security at the time of the incident.

Victims

Lauralee Sipe, 38, Speight's sister
Dwayne S. Sipe, 38, husband of Lauralee Sipe
Joshua Sipe, 4, son of Lauralee and Dwayne Sipe
Morgan L. Dobyns, 15, daughter of Lauralee Sipe
Emily A. Quarles, 15, friend of Morgan Dobyns
Jonathan L. Quarles, 43, father of Emily Quarles
Karen Quarles, 43, mother of Emily Quarles
Ronald I. Scruggs, 16, boyfriend of Emily Quarles

Aftermath
On June 24, 2010, Appomattox County Circuit Court Judge Richard Blanton signed an order declaring Speight incompetent to stand trial.  He was ordered sent to a state psychiatric hospital until such a time when he is able to assist his attorneys with his defense.

Two years after the shootings, police revealed that the three Sipes in the house were likely killed two days before Speight fatally shot the other five victims.

The case remained on hold for years as attorneys dealt with pretrial motions and awaited additional mental evaluations. According to investigators Speight told them that he had been ordered by an Egyptian goddess named Jennifer to shoot his family, because they were possessed by demons. The others were killed, he said, so they could not help his first victims, since Jennifer demanded that their bodies had to rot.

On February 15, 2013, Speight was sentenced in a plea deal to five life terms plus 18 years on three counts of capital murder, one count of attempted capital murder of a police officer (presumably because of the shots fired at the state police helicopter), and five firearms counts. The Commonwealth's Attorney Darrel Puckett said mental health experts for both the defense and the state had found Speight insane at the time, "rendering a death sentence highly unlikely" had the case gone to trial.

References

External links
Police Surround Gunman After He Kills 8 in Virginia, The New York Times (January 19, 2010) 
Suspect in 8 Va. deaths may have left explosives, The Washington Post (January 20, 2010)
Uncle: No sign of trouble from Va. killing suspect, The Washington Post (January 21, 2010)

2010 active shooter incidents in the United States
Mass shootings in Virginia
Murder in Virginia
2010 murders in the United States
Deaths by firearm in Virginia
Mass murder in 2010
2010 in Virginia
Spree shootings in the United States
Familicides
Crimes in Virginia
Attacks in the United States in 2010
January 2010 crimes in the United States
Mass shootings in the United States
2010 mass shootings in the United States